Events in the year 2020 in Argentina.

Incumbents
President: Alberto Fernández 
Vice President: Cristina Fernández de Kirchner

Governors
Governor of Buenos Aires Province: Axel Kicillof
Governor of Catamarca Province: Raúl Jalil
Governor of Chaco Province: Jorge Capitanich
Governor of Chubut Province: Mariano Arcioni
Governor of Córdoba: Juan Schiaretti
Governor of Corrientes Province: Gustavo Valdés
Governor of Entre Ríos Province: Gustavo Bordet
Governor of Formosa Province: Gildo Insfrán
Governor of Jujuy Province: Gerardo Morales
Governor of La Pampa Province: Sergio Ziliotto
Governor of La Rioja Province: Ricardo Quintela
Governor of Mendoza Province: Rodolfo Suárez
Governor of Misiones Province: Oscar Herrera Ahuad
Governor of Neuquén Province: Omar Gutiérrez
Governor of Río Negro Province: Arabela Carreras
Governor of Salta Province: Gustavo Sáenz
Governor of San Juan Province: Sergio Uñac
Governor of San Luis Province: Alberto Rodríguez Saá
Governor of Santa Cruz Province: Alicia Kirchner
Governor of Santa Fe Province: Omar Perotti
Governor of Santiago del Estero: Gerardo Zamora
Governor of Tierra del Fuego: Gustavo Melella
Governor of Tucumán: Juan Luis Manzur

Vice Governors
Vice Governor of Buenos Aires Province: Verónica Magario 
Vice Governor of Catamarca Province: Rubén Dusso
Vice Governor of Chaco Province: Analía Rach Quiroga 
Vice Governor of Corrientes Province: Gustavo Canteros 
Vice Governor of Entre Rios Province: María Laura Stratta
Vice Governor of Formosa Province: Eber Wilson Solís
Vice Governor of Jujuy Province: Carlos Haquim
Vice Governor of La Pampa Province: Mariano Fernández 
Vice Governor of La Rioja Province: Florencia López
Vice Governor of Misiones Province: Carlos Omar Arce
Vice Governor of Nenquen Province: Marcos Koopmann 
Vice Governor of Rio Negro Province: Alejandro Palmieri
Vice Governor of Salta Province: Antonio Marocco
Vice Governor of San Juan Province: Roberto Gattoni
Vice Governor of San Luis Province: Eduardo Mones Ruiz
Vice Governor of Santa Cruz: Eugenio Quiroga
Vice Governor of Santa Fe Province: Alejandra Rodenas
Vice Governor of Santiago del Estero: Carlos Silva Neder
Vice Governor of Tierra del Fuego: Mónica Urquiza

Ongoing events
COVID-19 pandemic in Argentina

Events by month

January
January 18 – Fernando Báez Sosa, an 18-year old law student, is beaten to death by a group of amateur rugby players in Villa Gesell; the case gained nationwide notoriety.

March
March 3 – The first case of COVID-19 was confirmed in Argentina: a 43-year-old man who had arrived two days earlier from Milan, Italy.
March 7 – The Ministry of Health confirmed the country's first documented death of COVID-19, a 64-year-old man who had travelled to Paris, France, who also had other health conditions; the case was only confirmed as positive after the patient's demise.
March 19 – A nation-wide lockdown was established in Argentina due to the COVID-19 pandemic.

May
May 4 – New controls over the purchasing of American dollars by the Central Bank of Argentina came into force. The measures apply to both companies and individual savers.

August
August 30 – Earth observation satellite SAOCOM 1B launches from SLC-40.

December 

December 30 – Abortion legalised by the Congress with 38 votes in favour and 29 against.

Deaths

January 
January 3 – Stella Maris Leverberg, politician and trade unionist (b. 1962).
January 9 – Pampero Firpo, wrestler (b. 1930).

February 
February 4 – Claudio Bonadio, federal judge (b. 1956).
February 25 – Erico Spinadel, Austrian-Argentine industrial engineer (b. 1929).
February 27 – Braian Toledo, javelin thrower (b. 1993).

March 
March 10 – Marcelo Peralta, saxophonist (b. 1961).
March 13 – Alejandro Betts, historian and political activist (b. 1947).
March 20 – Amadeo Carrizo, football player (b. 1926).
March 27
Roberto Alemann, politician (b. 1922).
Elvia Andreoli, actress (b. 1950 or 1951).
March 28 – Nicolás Brizuela, musician (b. 1949).

April 
April 1 – Mario Chaldú, football player (b. 1942).
April 2 – Juan Giménez, comic book artist (b. 1943).

May 
May 15 - Sergio Denis, singer and actor (b. 1949).
May 25 – Ricardo Barreda, convicted mass murderer (b. 1936).

July 
July 30 – Juan Ramón, singer and actor (b. 1940).

November 
November 25 – Diego Maradona, footballer (b. 1960).

References

 
2020s in Argentina
Years of the 21st century in Argentina
Argentina
Argentina